= Saihangol mine =

Mine in Mongolia

- Location: Mongolia
- Products: Manganese

The Saihangol mine is a mine located in the north of Mongolia. Saihangol represents one of the largest manganese reserve in Mongolia having estimated reserves of 293 million tonnes of manganese ore grading 36.7% manganese metal.
